Ashok is a 2006 Indian Telugu-language masala film produced by Maharishi Cinema, directed and written by Surender Reddy, starring NTR Jr., Sameera Reddy, Prakash Raj, and Sonu Sood in the lead roles. It is a movie about redemption in which the title character must make amends to his father after being blamed for his grandmother's death while meeting a girl who understands him and his burdens; at the same time, he must also battle against a mafia-like organisation that hates him.

The movie was released in Andhra Pradesh on 14 July 2006. It was an average grosser at the box office. It was remade into Bengali Bangladesh as Babar Kosom (2007) with Manna and Nipun Akter.

Plot
Ashok is a mechanic who is thrown out of his house because of his rash actions that have led to the death of his grandmother. His father still harbours anger against Ashok despite his good behaviour that has a positive outcome. Ashok then happens to meet an insecure yet talented dancer named Anjali and fall in love with her. Anjali witnesses a crime involving KK, the leader of one of the largest crime syndicates in Andhra Pradesh. KK then tries to ensnare Anjali within his evil plans, while Ashok wages a one-man war against KK's gang.

Ashok's friend Rajiv attempts to rescue Anjali, but KK has him killed. Ashok then avenges Rajiv's death by killing KK's brother, Panda. This enrages KK, and his gang captures Ashok's sister, demanding that Ashok hands himself over to them in return for her safety. Ashok's father drags him to KK's manor and orders him to save his sister. Ashok and KK then get into a dramatic fight at Ashok's sister's wedding. Just when it appears that Ashok will emerge the winner, KK's mother tries to shoot Ashok but accidentally kills her own son. She drops the gun and falls down dead, apparently dying of shock. The film ends with Ashok's sister getting married and Ashok receiving his father's forgiveness.

Cast
 NTR Jr as Ashok
 Sameera Reddy as Anjali
 Prakash Raj as Ashok's father
 Sonu Sood as KK
 Rajiv Kanakala as Rajiv
 Vadivukkarasi as KK's mother
 Revathi as Ashok's sister
 Rama Prabha as Ashok's grandmother
 Sudha as Ashok's mother
 Raghu Babu as Anjali's brother
 Surekha Vani as Anjali's sister-in-law
 Venu Madhav as Jaggu
 Satyam Rajesh as Rajesh, Ashok's friend
 Supreeth Reddy as Panda, KK's brother
 Jeeva as KK's henchman
 Fish Venkat as KK's henchman
 Narsing Yadav as KK's henchman
 Duvvasi Mohan as TV Reporter
 Chatrapathi Sekhar as Sekhar
 Krishna Bhagavan as Police Inspector
 Ravi Kale
 Stunt Silva

Music
The music was composed by Mani Sharma and released by Aditya Music.

Release
The film was shot in Super 35 format. It was released with 228 prints.

The film was later dubbed and released in Tamil, Hindi and Bhojpuri as Ashok and The Fighterman Ghayal (2008) respectively. The Malayalam Dubbed version was telecasted on Zee Keralam.

Reception
The film collected 25 crore in its opening weekend.

References

External links

2006 films
2006 action films
2000s Telugu-language films
Films directed by Surender Reddy
Films scored by Mani Sharma
Films shot in Hyderabad, India